The General is the tenth novel in the CHERUB series by Robert Muchamore. The primary action of the novel is set in the Nevada desert during a joint training exercise of American and British troops.

Plot
As the Christmas of 2007 approaches, James Adams taking part in a mass riot organized by Chris Bradford, the charismatic leader of anarchist group SAG (Street Action Group). He later acts as Bradford's bodyguard during a meeting with a gun supplier and successfully plants a surveillance device, only for the police to arrive unexpectedly and arrest everyone, aborting the mission. James returns to campus to discover that his girlfriend Dana Smith has been cheating on him with fellow cherub Michael Hendry, and breaks up with her.

Meanwhile, James' sister Lauren and some younger agents are sent to test the security of an air traffic control centre. They capture all the security guards and cause a lot of damage, but miss an engineer who calls in the RAF. The mission is still regarded as successful, having exposed security weaknesses.

On New Year's Day a select team of CHERUB agents, including James and Lauren, fly to Las Vegas for a brief vacation on the way to Fort Reagan, the world's largest urban warfare training compound. They are to take part in a two-week exercise along with forty British SAS commandos, posing as insurgents in an area controlled by an American battalion of a thousand soldiers. Weapons are restricted to paint guns and grenades.

Under the leadership of Ukrainian trainer Yosyp Kazakov, who is bitterly anti-American, the "insurgents" soon make their first move, knocking out aerial surveillance by wrecking the American spy drones. During this raid, James and a British sergeant sneak into the army base to add a powerful laxative to the base's water system, incapacitating the majority of the American troops with violent diarrhoea. The "insurgents" persuade some drunken students, posing as "civilians" in the exercise, to join them in storming the base. The American commander General Shirley is "killed" by a paint grenade dropped by cherub Kevin Sumner. The Americans are overrun and suspend the exercise after only two days.

Kazakov's tactics, though effective, are so controversial that he and James are asked to leave before the exercise restarts. As they have some free time, Kazakov persuades James to put his mathematical skills to illegal use, counting cards on blackjack tables in Las Vegas. Despite James almost being caught, they end up winning over $90,000.

Arriving back at campus, Lauren mentions to James that his ex-girlfriend, Kerry Chang, has broken up with her boyfriend Bruce Norris after having a massive ruck at the hotel they were staying at after the exercise.

Promotion
An official competition was run by Robert Muchamore, where a signed copy of the book was promised to any reader who could supply him with the password of one of his forum staff members.

The novel was released on 7 August 2008 in Australia and NZ, and on 4 September in the UK.

Cover 
The British cover for The General is two playing cards. One is the Jack of Hearts, with 2 bullet holes in it, and the other shows a red CHERUB logo.

Footnotes

External links
Official CHERUB site page for book

CHERUB novels
2008 British novels
Novels set in Nevada
Hodder & Stoughton books